Luigi Gioli (16 November 1854, San Frediano a Settimo – 27 October 1947, Florence) was an Italian painter.

Biography
After graduating in law, Luigi Gioli was drawn to painting, following in the footsteps of his elder brother, Francesco. He came into contact with the Post-Macchiaioli painters, with whom he practised on subjects from rural life, mainly drawn from the Tuscan countryside.

On a trip to Paris in 1878, he became acquainted with the work of Edgar Degas, expanding his own repertoire with new themes taken from urban life and equestrian subjects. He remained attached to macchia painting, specialising in Maremma landscapes featuring animals, and it was this style that distinguished his work at the 1887 Esposizione d’Arte in Venice and the 1889 Exposition Universelle in Paris.

Towards the end of the 19th century he went to the Adriatic coast to paint with his brother. He participated in the major Italian exhibitions at the beginning of the 20th  century, in particular the Esposizione Universale in Rome in 1911.

Sources
 Elena Lissoni, Luigi Gioli, online catalogue Artgate by Fondazione Cariplo, 2010, CC BY-SA (source for the first revision of this article).

External links

19th-century Italian painters
19th-century Italian male artists
Italian male painters
20th-century Italian painters
20th-century Italian male artists
People from the Province of Pisa
Painters from Tuscany
1854 births
1947 deaths